Luigi Pennacchio (1 January 1933 – 21 March 2001) was an Italian ski jumper. He competed at the 1956 Winter Olympics and the 1960 Winter Olympics.

References

External links
 

1933 births
2001 deaths
Italian male ski jumpers
Olympic ski jumpers of Italy
Ski jumpers at the 1956 Winter Olympics
Ski jumpers at the 1960 Winter Olympics
Sportspeople from the Province of Brescia